Daniel R. Headrick is an American historian and writer who specializes in the history of international relations, technology, and the environment.

Biography 

Daniel R. Headrick was born on August 2, 1941, in Bay Shore, N.Y., USA. He attended secondary school in Germany and France and university in Spain, Italy, and the United States. He obtained a B.A. in economics from Swarthmore College in 1962, an M.A. in international relations from the Johns Hopkins School of Advanced International Studies in 1964, and a PhD in history from Princeton University in 1971 with a thesis on "The Spanish Army, 1868-1898 : Structure, Function and Politics".

Headrick taught at Tuskegee Institute (now Tuskegee University) in Alabama from 1968 to 1975 and at Roosevelt University in Chicago from 1975 to 2008. He was an N.E.H. Visiting Scholar at Hawaii Pacific University in 2000.

He was married to Rita Koplowitz Headrick from 1965 to 1988 and to Kate Ezra from 1992 to the present. He has three children. He currently lives in New Haven, Connecticut. e:dan.headrick[at]att.net

Scholarly Publications 

 Humans Versus Nature: A Global Environmental History, Oxford University Press, 2020.
 Power Over Peoples: Technology, Environments, and Western Imperialism, 1400 to the Present, Princeton University Press, 2010.
 Technology: A World History, Oxford University Press, 2009.
 When Information Came of Age: Technologies of Knowledge in the Age of Reason and Revoluion, 1700-1850, Oxford University Press, 2000.
 The Earth and Its Peoples: A Global History (co-authored with Richard Bulliet, Pamela Kyle Crossley, Stephen Hirsch, Lyman Johnson, and David Northrup), Houghton-Mifflin, 1997, 2000, 2004, and 2007.
 The Invisible Weapon: Telecommunications and International Politics, 1851-1945, Oxford University Press, 1991.
 The Tentacles of Progress: Technology Transfer in the Age of Imperialism, 1850-1940, Oxford University Press, 1988.
 The Tools of Empire: Technology and European Imperialism in the Nineteenth Century, Oxford University Press, 1981.
 Ejército y política en España (1866-1898), Madrid: Editorial Tecnos, 1981.

Headrick's books have been translated into Spanish, Italian, Turkish, German, Arabic, Chinese, and Japanese.

Headrick has also published numerous articles and book reviews in scholarly journals in the United States, France, Germany, Italy, and Spain.

Honors and Grants 

Headrick received a John Simon Guggenheim Fellowship in 1994, an Alfred P. Sloan Foundation Fellowship in 1998, and N.E.H. Fellowships in 1983, 1986, 1987, 1988, and 1990.

He has given keynote speeches at conferences in the Netherlands, Germany, Colombia, Hawaii, and California, as well as invited scholarly papers at conferences in Canada, China, France, Germany, Italy, Japan, Spain, Sweden, the United Kingdom, and the United States.

References 

20th-century American historians
21st-century American historians
Living people
20th-century American male writers
21st-century American male writers

Historians of technology
American male non-fiction writers
Year of birth missing (living people)